Souls' Chapel is American country singer Marty Stuart's 12th studio album, and his second album with his band, the Fabulous Superlatives, released in 2005. This is also Stuart's second concept album (with The Pilgrim being his first). With this project, Stuart and his Superlatives devote the entire album to gospel songs. The album also features select songs in which Stuart's lead vocal performances are unprominent, and are showcased instead by those of the Superlatives' fellow members: 'Cousin' Kenny Vaughan (guitar), 'Handsome' Harry Stinson (drums) and 'Brother' Brian Glenn (bass). The album also features a guest appearance from Mavis Staples on the track 'Move Along Train'.

Track listing

Personnel

Marty Stuart & His Fabulous Superlatives
Brian Glenn - bass guitar, vocals
Harry Stinson - drums, vocals
Marty Stuart - acoustic guitar, electric guitar, vocals
Kenny Vaughan - electric guitar, vocals

Additional Musicians
Barry Beckett - Hammond organ
Chad Cromwell - drums
Paul Griffith - drums
Tony Harrell - Hammond organ
Michael Rhodes - bass guitar 
Mavis Staples - vocals
Glenn Worf - bass guitar

Awards

The album was nominated for a Dove Award for Country Album of the Year at the 37th GMA Dove Awards.

Chart performance

References

2005 albums
Marty Stuart albums